

Ha

He

Hi

Ho

Hu

Hy

 H